Charles Trueheart (born September 5, 1951) is an American journalist and essayist who writes about books, authors and literary issues.  He was the director of the American Library in Paris from 2007 to 2017, and is now Paris editor for The American Scholar magazine.

Life and career
Trueheart was born in Washington DC in 1951. His father, William Trueheart, was a Foreign Service Officer with the U.S. State Department, and he grew up overseas, in Paris, Ankara. London, and Saigon. He graduated from Phillips Exeter Academy in 1969 and from Amherst College in 1973.

He began his journalism career as an editorial writer and book reviewer at the Greensboro Daily News in North Carolina from 1973 until 1978, then as an editorial page editor for the Baltimore News-American from 1978 to 1981. From 1981 to 1983 he was the West Coast correspondent for Publishers Weekly magazine, and from 1982 to 1986 he was a columnist for the newspaper USA Today. From 1983 to 1986, Trueheart served as associate director of the Harvard Institute of Politics, where he directed the Public Affairs Forum at the John F. Kennedy School of Government, and oversaw the training programs for newly elected American mayors and members of the US Congress.
 
In 1986 Trueheart returned to journalism, joining the staff of The Washington Post, covering books, authors, the publishing industry, and literary and intellectual issues. In 1992, he became a foreign correspondent for the Post, serving first as Canada correspondent and then as Paris correspondent (1996-2000), covering French politics and society and news throughout Europe, including extensive coverage of war crimes tribunals in The Hague.

He left the Post in 2000, and served briefly as counselor and speechwriter for the U.S. Ambassador to France, Felix Rohatyn. He became Director of the American Library in Paris, a position he held until he retired in 2017. He now contributes essays and book reviews to the Atlantic Monthly, and other publications, and is the Paris editor for The American Scholar magazine. In 2017 he began working on a book about Saigon in 1963.

Personal life
Trueheart is married to Anne Swardson, editor-at-large with Bloomberg News. They have two grown children.

Bibliography

References

1951 births
Living people
21st-century American journalists
Amherst College alumni
The Atlantic (magazine) people